Friedrich Benfer (28 August 1905 – 30 January 1996) was a German film actor.

Selected filmography
 I Was a Student at Heidelberg (1927)
 Docks of Hamburg (1928)
 The Smuggler's Bride of Mallorca (1929)
 The Flight from Love (1929)
 The League of Three (1929)
 Three Bluejackets and a Blonde (1933)
 Everybody's Woman (1934)
 Hearts are Trumps (1934)
 Hard Luck Mary (1934)
 Little Mother (1935)
 The Night With the Emperor (1936)
 Victoria in Dover (1936)
 Nights in Andalusia (1938)
 Wibbel the Tailor (1939)
 The Heart of a Queen (1940)
 Lucrezia Borgia (1940)

References

External links
 

1905 births
1996 deaths
German male film actors
Italian emigrants to Germany
20th-century Italian male actors